Saryu Roy (born 16 July 1951) is an Indian politician, who was formerly a BJP leader in Bihar and Jharkhand. He left BJP before 2019 assembly elections in Jharkhand, and won as an independent from Jamshedpur East, defeating the incumbent Chief Minister Raghubar Das.

Early life and education

Career
He served as a Minister of Food and Supply Department in the BJP led government in the state of Jharkhand. He was elected to Jharkhand assembly in December 2014 from Jamshedpur-West constituency for the second time after defeating his nearest rival Banna Gupta by a margin of over 10,000 votes.

He was first elected as an MLA from Jamshedpur-West constituency in 2005. He lost the 2009 assembly seat by a narrow margin of around 3000 votes to the then INC candidate Banna Gupta. Prior to this, in the undivided Bihar he served as an MLC for a six-year term from 1998 to 2004.

References

External links
Saryuroy.in
Prabhatkhabar.com
Ibnlive.com

1951 births
Living people
Members of the Jharkhand Legislative Assembly
Bharatiya Janata Party politicians from Jharkhand
21st-century Indian politicians